HD 60532 is a white (F-type) main sequence star located approximately 84 light-years away in the constellation of Puppis, taking its primary name from its Henry Draper Catalogue designation. It is calculated to be 1.44 times more massive than the Sun. The star is only 59% as old as the Sun (2.7 Gyr) and has metallicity of only 38% that of the Sun. In 2008, two extrasolar planets were discovered in orbit around it.

Planetary system
In September 2008, two Jupiter-like planets were found orbiting the star. The orbital periods of these two planets appear to be in 3:1 resonance.

See also
 HD 69830
 List of extrasolar planets

References

External links
 

F-type main-sequence stars
Puppis
060532
036795
2906
0279
BD-21 2007
Planetary systems with two confirmed planets
J07340317-2217457